Ruis can mean:

 Ruis (letter), a letter of the Ogham alphabet
 Ruis, Switzerland, a kreis in Switzerland
 the municipality of Rueun in Switzerland, formerly known as Ruis
 Rye, which translates to "ruis" in the Finnish language
 RUIS acronym of Revolutionary Union for Internationalist Solidarity, an anarchist militia in the Syrian Civil War.